Devosia glacialis is a psychrophilic Gram-negative, aerobic, motile bacteria from the genus of Devosia with a polar flagella which was isolated from a glacier in the Hohe Tauern in Austria.

References

External links
Type strain of Devosia glacialis at BacDive -  the Bacterial Diversity Metadatabase

Hyphomicrobiales
Bacteria described in 2012